{{Infraspeciesbox
|name = Genoa River correa
|image =
|image_caption = 
|status_system = EPBC
|status = EN
|genus = Correa
|species = lawrenceana
|varietas = genoensis
|authority = Paul G.Wilson<ref name="APC">{{cite web |title=Correa lawrenceana var. genoensis |url=https://biodiversity.org.au/nsl/services/apc-format/display/80621|publisher=Australian Plant Census |accessdate= 12 July 2020}}</ref>
|synonyms_ref =  
|synonyms = * Correa lawrenciana var. genoensis Paul G.Wilson orth.var.
}}Correa lawrenceana var. genoensis, commonly known as the Genoa River correa, is a variety of Correa lawrenceana and is endemic to south-eastern Australia. It is a shrub with egg-shaped leaves and yellowish green flowers usually arranged singly in leaf axils.

Flowering mostly occurs in spring.

Taxonomy
The variety genoensis was first formally described in 1961 by Paul Wilson in Transactions of the Royal Society of South Australia from specimens collected by Ferdinand von Mueller on "flooded banks" of the Genoa River in 1860.

Distribution and habitat
This variety of C. lawrenceana grows along the Genoa River and its tributaries near the New South Wales - Victoria border.

Conservation status
This variety is listed as  "endangered" under the Australian Government Environment Protection and Biodiversity Conservation Act 1999, the New South Wales Government Biodiversity Conservation Act 2016 and the Victorian Government Flora and Fauna Guarantee Act 1988''. A National Recovery Plan has been prepared. The main threats to the species are the species' limited distribution, weed invasion, altered fire regimes and floods.

References

lawrenciana genoensis
Flora of Victoria (Australia)
Flora of New South Wales
Taxa named by Paul G. Wilson
Plants described in 1961